WKRC (550 kHz) is a commercial AM radio station owned by iHeartMedia and licensed to Cincinnati, Ohio.  Broadcasting under the branding of 55KRC, the station airs a talk radio format.  The studios are on Montgomery Road in Cincinnati, and the transmitter is in Cold Spring, Kentucky.  WKRC operates at 5,000 watts by day and 1,000 watts at night.

WKRC is co-owned with another Cincinnati iHeartMedia talk station, 700 WLW.  While WLW airs mostly local talk and sports programming, WKRC largely carries nationally syndicated talk shows.  WKRC is the former sister station to Channel 12 WKRC-TV in Cincinnati, both having been owned by Taft Broadcasting, Jacor Communications, and later Clear Channel Communications (now known as iHeartMedia), until the television station was sold to Newport Television, LLC.

Despite the similarities in their call letters, WKRC was not the inspiration behind the television show WKRP in Cincinnati.  The show's creator, Hugh Wilson, wrote the premise based on his experiences at WQXI in Atlanta.

History
WKRC is one of the oldest radio stations in Ohio. It was first licensed in May 1924 to the Ainsworth-Gates Radio Co. of Cincinnati, and was issued the sequentially assigned call letters WFBW. The station changed its call sign to WMH beginning on June 14, 1924. (An earlier WMH, which was Cincinnati's first broadcasting station, had been operated by the Precision Equipment Company until January 1923.)

In 1925, the station was purchased by the Kodel Radio Corporation.  Kodel changed the call letters to WKRC to match its initials.   WKRC was a charter member of the CBS Radio Network, and was one of the 16 stations that aired the first CBS network program on September 18, 1927. CBS purchased WKRC in November 1931, turning it into an owned and operated station. CBS sold it to The Cincinnati Times-Star in September 1939. The Times-Star was owned by the Taft Family, and this purchase was the genesis of Taft Broadcasting, with WKRC as its flagship station.

In 1947, Taft signed on an FM station at 101.9 MHz.  The FM station used its own call sign at first, WCTS, which stood for Cincinnati Times-Star.  It later switched to WKRC-FM and today is WKRQ.  In 1949, Taft Broadcasting added Cincinnati's second television station, Channel 11 WKRC-TV (now on Channel 12).

As network programming moved from radio to television in the 1950s, WKRC switched to a full service middle of the road (MOR) music format and was an affiliate of the ABC Entertainment Radio Network. In the 1980s, the music moved from MOR to adult contemporary.

On November 29, 1992, after Jacor acquired the station via a local marketing agreement (LMA), WKRC began stunting with a computerized countdown. A week later, WKRC debuted a new talk radio format as WLWA, a complementary service to WLW. In 1994, the station assumed the WCKY and some programming used on WCKY (1530 AM), itself renamed WSAI (1530 AM).

In 1997 the station's call letters returned to WKRC, offering a schedule of local and national talk programs, some of them from Westwood One.  In 1999, Clear Channel Communications, the forerunner of current owner iHeartMedia, acquired Jacor Broadcasting, including WKRC.

Programming
WKRC personality Brian Thomas hosts the station's locally-based morning drive program. The remainder of WKRC's weekday lineup consists of nationally syndicated shows: The Glenn Beck Program, Rose Unplugged and The Sean Hannity Show (all syndicated by Premiere Networks); The Dave Ramsey Show, The Mark Levin Show (via Westwood One), and Coast to Coast AM (via Premiere).

Weekend programming includes Gary Sullivan's At Home, via Premiere and which originates from WKRC on Saturday and Sunday mornings.

References

External links 

KRC
IHeartMedia radio stations
News and talk radio stations in the United States
Radio stations established in 1924
1924 establishments in Ohio
Taft Broadcasting